Freienhagen may refer to the following places in Germany:

Freienhagen, Thuringia, in the Eichsfeld district, Thuringia
A locality in the city of Liebenwalde, in the Oberhavel district, Brandenburg
Freienhagen (Fuldabrück), part of Fuldabrück, in the Kassel district, Hesse
Freienhagen (Waldeck), part of Waldeck, in Waldeck-Frankenberg district, Hesse